This is a list of notable Brazilian painters.

A–E

 Abigail de Andrade
 Francisco Pedro do Amaral
 Tarsila do Amaral
 Pedro Américo
 Rodolfo Amoedo
 Constantine Andreou
 Félix Bernardelli
 Romero Britto
 João Câmara
 Iberê Camargo
 Lygia Clark
 Edgard Cognat 
 Fernando Da Silva
 Emiliano Di Cavalcanti
 Djanira da Motta e Silva
 Augustus Earle

F–M

 Clóvis Graciano
 Eli Heil
 Arcangelo Ianelli
 Fábio Innecco
 Almeida Junior
 Aldo Locatelli
 Juarez Machado
 Solange Magalhaes
 Anita Malfatti
 Denis Mandarino
 Ferreira Louis Marius
 Aldemir Martins
 Manuel Martins
 Victor Meirelles
 Sérgio Milliet
 Sergio Rossetti Morosini
 Ismael Nery
 Fulvio Pennacchi
 Georgina de Albuquerque
 Grupo Santa Helena (collective)
 Hélio Oiticica
 Hipólito Boaventura Caron 
 Humberto Rosa
 José Ferraz de Almeida Júnior
 José Pancetti
 Karl Ernst Papf
 Lasar Segall
 Lucas Pennacchi
 Manuel de Araújo Porto-Alegre
 Manuel Dias de Oliveira
 Mario Zanini

N–P

 Naza
 Constancia Nery
 Nicson
 Antônio Parreiras
 Antonio Peticov
 Wanda Pimentel
 Antônio Rafael Pinto Bandeira 
 Candido Portinari

R–Z

 Francisco Rebolo
 Vicente do Rego Monteiro
 Alfredo Rizzotti
 Simplício Rodrigues de Sá
 Sidnei Tendler
 Rubem Valentim
 Eliseu Visconti
 Alfredo Volpi
 Bertha Worms
 Niobe Xandó
 Emmanuel Zamor

See also

 Brazilian art
 List of Brazilian artists

Painters
Brazilian